La Villeneuve-lès-Charleville (literally La Villeneuve near Charleville) is a commune in the Marne department in north-eastern France.

See also
Communes of the Marne department

References

Villeneuvelescharleville